John Gordon Doubleday  (27 November 1920–27 April 1982) was a British diplomat who was ambassador to Liberia.

Biography
Doubleday was educated at Bedford School and at St John's College, Cambridge.  After service in the Royal Air Force during the Second World War, and then service in the Colonial Administrative Service in Northern Rhodesia between 1949 and 1965, he entered the British Diplomatic Service in 1965.  He was Deputy High Commissioner to the Bahamas between 1973 and 1976 and to Sri Lanka between 1976 and 1978, before serving as Ambassador to Liberia between 1978 and 1980. He was appointed OBE in the 1975 Birthday Honours.

References

1920 births
1982 deaths
People educated at Bedford School
Alumni of St John's College, Cambridge
Royal Air Force Volunteer Reserve personnel of World War II
Colonial Administrative Service officers
Members of HM Diplomatic Service
Ambassadors of the United Kingdom to Liberia
British expatriates in Zambia
British expatriates in Sri Lanka
British expatriates in the Bahamas
20th-century British diplomats